

The Fokker D.XI was a 1920s Dutch single-seat fighter designed and built by Fokker

Design and development
The D.XI was designed by Reinhold Platz for Fokker and first flew on 23 March 1923. It was a single-seat sesquiplane (the lower wing was smaller than the upper) with a fixed tailskid landing gear. Due to financial problems, the Dutch government did not place an order, but 117 were built for export. There was some minor changes in design between customers, but all had the single-bay v-strut wing and powered by a 224 kW (300 hp) Hispano-Suiza piston engine. The twin radiators for the engine were mounted on the sides of the nose.

Operational history
The main customer was the USSR who operated the aircraft until 1929. The United States Army bought three aircraft for evaluation with the designation PW-7 and powered by a 328 kW (440 hp) Curtiss D.12. 50 aircraft on order for Germany were cancelled.

Operators

Argentine Army Aviation operated one aircraft

Royal Romanian Air Force - 50 purchased 1925

Soviet Air Force

Spanish Air Force

Swiss Air Force

United States Army Air Service

Specifications

Notes

References

 
 
 John Andrade, U.S.Military Aircraft Designations and Serials since 1909, Midland Counties Publications, 1979,  (Page 160)
 The Illustrated Encyclopedia of Aircraft (Part Work 1982-1985), 1985, Orbis Publishing, pages 1874/5
 Los Fokker argentinos (Período 1919-1942)

1920s Dutch fighter aircraft
D 11
Sesquiplanes
Aircraft first flown in 1923